, was an admiral in the Imperial Japanese Navy during World War II.

Biography

Early life
Ōmori was born in Kumamoto prefecture and graduated from the 41st class of the Imperial Japanese Naval Academy in 1913. He was ranked 16th out of 118 cadets. He subsequently served on the battleship  and destroyer .

Ōmori returned to school, and became a torpedo expert.

He was promoted to rear admiral on 15 November 1940.

World War II
At the start of World War II, Ōmori was in command of Destroyer Squadron 1 (DesRon1), which accompanied the main strike force during the attack on Pearl Harbor. It also participated in the Indian Ocean Raid of early 1942. During the Battle of Midway, DesRon1 directed the occupation of Attu Island in the Battle of the Aleutian Islands. Omori was given command of Cruiser Division 5 (CruDiv5). Assigned to the Solomon Islands, he was ordered to attack American transports off Bougainville Island in early November 1943.

Ōmori became Commandant of the Torpedo School, and was promoted to vice admiral on 1 July 1944. He was director of the Special Attack Division from 13 September 1944–10 August 1945, supervising work with the Kaiten human-guided torpedoes. At the very end of World War II, he was appointed Commander in Chief of the IJN 7th Fleet.

Ōmori died on 24 December 1974.

References

Books

External links

Notes

1892 births
1974 deaths
People from Kumamoto Prefecture
Japanese admirals of World War II
Aleutian Islands campaign